The discography of Vader, a Polish death metal band, consists of twelve studio albums, two compilation albums, two live albums, eight extended plays, one cover album, four video albums, nine singles, twelve music videos, and three demo albums. Formed in 1983, the group was founded by then bassist Piotr "Peter" Wiwczarek, and guitarist Zbigniew "Vika" Wróblewski.

After release of three demo albums – Live in Decay (1986), Necrolust (1989), and Morbid Reich (1990), Vader was signed to British record label Earache Records. The band's debut album The Ultimate Incantation was released in late 1992, and gained recognition in the death metal scene. It was supported by "Dark Age" music video produced for MTV. Vader's second album, entitled De Profundis, was released in 1995, followed by the 1997 release Black to the Blind. Critically acclaimed albums heave been released by System Shock/Impact Records, back then, the band's main label.

In late 1990s, Vader was signed to Metal Blade Records. The label released in 2000 the band's fourth album Litany, which had sales of around of 45,000 units around the world in three months from its release. The CD also gained positive response in Vader's home country, reaching number 1 on Gazeta Wyborcza bestsellers list. The album was followed by the 2002 release Revelations, and The Beast from 2004, charting 22 and 8 on OLiS, respectively. After signing to Regain Records, Vader released their seventh effort Impressions in Blood in 2006. In 2009, the band made a record deal with Nuclear Blast, the company that released Vader's eighth album Necropolis (2009).

Band's last ninth album entitled Welcome to the Morbid Reich was released in 2011, and it is probably Vader's biggest commercial success to date. The album reached number 17 on the Billboard Top New Artist Albums (Heatseekers), and number 25 on the Hard Rock Albums. In Poland, Welcome to the Morbid Reich landed at number 6, and dropped out four weeks later. The release also charted in France, Japan, Switzerland, and Germany.

Studio albums

Cover albums

Live albums

Compilations

Rerecorded

EPs

Video albums

Singles

2020
Shock and Awe

Demos

Other appearances

Music videos

References

External links
Official Vader website 

Heavy metal group discographies
Discographies of Polish artists